Smeaton House, also known as Smeaton Castle, and now as Dalkeith Home Farm,  is a courtyard castle dating from the fifteenth century, about  north of Dalkeith, and  south of Inveresk in East Lothian, Scotland.

History
In 1450 the lands on which Smeaton Castle are built were the property of the Abbey of Dunfermline.  Thereafter they passed to the Richardsons.  The buildings now form part of a farm.

Robert Richardson (d. 1578) was treasurer of Scotland, and was said to have built a new house at Smeaton in 1577. He raised money for Regent Moray by pawning the personal jewellery of Mary, Queen of Scots. These items included a gold chain belt of pearl knots and a hair garnishing with 57 diamonds which his son James Richardson returned to Holyrood Palace on 18 March 1580.

The inhabitants of Smeaton, Inveresk, and Monktonhall complained about the Richardsons in 1581 to the Privy Council. By long tradition they were tenants of Dunfermline Abbey and they objected to the new "feu" of the lands obtained by the Richardsons from Mary, Queen of Scots. The villagers claimed that the Richardsons had undertaken not to disturb their rights and tenancies, but in fact had exacted higher rents.

Archibald Douglas, 8th Earl of Angus died at Smeaton on 4 August 1588. His illness was attributed to witchcraft and Barbara Napier and Euphame MacCalzean were accused.

In the 1590s James VI of Scotland and Anne of Denmark frequently stayed nearby at Dalkeith Palace, and Anne sometimes dined at Smeaton, as she did on 8 August 1598.

Structure
The castle courtyard had rounded towers, but only two remain standing, with the curtain wall between them. These are the two western towers.    While one tower has been reduced in height the other remains at four storeys, with an adjoining square stair-tower.

One range of buildings also survives, but considerably changed.  It has a vaulted basement.

There are traces of a moat.

References

External links
 Smeaton House, HES/RCAHMS Canmore
 Letter from Mary, Queen of Scots, to the Laird of Smeaton, 1568, with audio: NMS

Castles in East Lothian
Musselburgh
Witchcraft in Scotland